Brian Royal (born 12 December 1961) is a former Australian rules footballer who played for the Footscray Football Club (Western Bulldogs) in the Australian Football League (AFL). 

In his first year for the Bulldogs, Royal won the Charles Sutton Medal, the Club's Best and Fairest award and went on to have an extremely distinguished career. Royal represented his state on seven occasions and was an All-Australian representative. His career came to an abrupt end on 199 games and 299 goals due to a ruptured Achilles tendon against  late in the 1993 season.

Royal is now coaching in the Victorian Amateur Football Association (VAFA), for the Beaumaris Football Club.

References

External links

1961 births
Living people
All-Australians (1953–1988)
Australian rules footballers from Victoria (Australia)
Charles Sutton Medal winners
People from Bairnsdale
Victorian State of Origin players
Western Bulldogs players
Bairnsdale Football Club players
Australia international rules football team players